To Britain With Love... And Bruises is a live studio album by the metal band My Ruin, released only in the UK and limited to 10,000 copies. It has songs from both of their previous studio albums Speak And Destroy and A Prayer Under Pressure Of Violent Anguish as well as the B-side "Masochrist" and a new spoken word opening track.

Track listing 
 "To Britain With Love"
 "Beauty Fiend"
 "Stick It To Me"
 "Heartsick"
 "Sick With Me"
 "Blasphemous Girl"
 "My Beautiful Flower"
 "Masochrist"
 "Sycophant"
 "Hemorrhage"
 "Rockstar"

Personnel 
 Tairrie B - vocals
 Mick Murphy - guitar
 Meghan Mattex - bass guitar
 Yael - drums 
 Bob Birthwright - producer, engineer, mixer

My Ruin albums
2003 live albums